Gavril Atanasov (1863–1951) was a prominent Bulgarian icon painter in the 19th century  from Berovo (Malesh region), in Ottoman Vardar Macedonia (present-day North Macedonia). His father was from Kruševo but moved to Berovo where Gavril was born in 1863. Gavril went to the Bulgarian school in Berovo. He painted around Berovo (Malesh region). Gavril Atanasov was the author of the icon of St. Demetrius in the church "Saint Demetrius" in Kyustendil, Bulgaria.

One of the monasteries where his painting can be found is the St. Arhangel Mihail Monastery in Berovo.

References 

1863 births
1951 deaths
People from Berovo
19th-century Bulgarian painters
19th-century Bulgarian male artists
20th-century Bulgarian painters
20th-century Bulgarian male artists
Male painters